Marrnyula Mununggurr (1964) is an Aboriginal Australian painter of the Djapu clan of the Yolngu people, known for her use of natural ochres on bark and hollow logs, wood carvings, linoleum and screen print productions.

Biography 
Born in North East Arnhem Land, Marrnyula Mununggurr is the daughter of renowned artists Djutadjuta Mununggurr and Nonggirrnga Marawili. Although she has no children of her own, Mununggurr was responsible for raising her deceased brother's three children.

Marrnyula Munungurr's paternal grandfather was the Djapu clan leader and artist Wonggu Mununggurr and her maternal grandfather was the Madarrpa leader and artist Mundukul Marawili.

Career 
Mununggurr currently works at the Buku-Larrnggay Mulka Centre at Yirrkala in Arnhem Land, a position she has occupied since Steve Fox was the art coordinator in the 1980s. From 1995-2011 she was the senior printmaker, trainer and manager of the Yirrkala Print Space, having trained under master printmaker Basil Hall.

Before that, she was known to assist both of her parents in producing their artworks. It is here that she developed her own style in narrative paintings after working on the venerated Djapu paintings, produced by her father, who won Best Bark Painting prize National Aboriginal and Torres Strait Islander Art Award in 1997.

In a profession once predominantly reserved for men, Mununggurr is unique in her field in respect to both her artwork and the fact that she is one of the few female bark painters. She further known to uphold the traditional paintings and designs of her people, the best exemplification of such being her work Djapu 2013, where she incorporates motifs and techniques observed within the paintings produced by her father (Djutjadjutja Mununggurr) and grandfather (Wonggu Mununggurr).

Mununggurr has partnered with her mother Nonggirrnga Mararwili, to produce the paintings of the Djapu clan design, which was exhibited in 2007 at the Annandale Gallery.

She has also been part of a major contemporary art survey, hosted by the Museum of Contemporary Art in Sydney in 2009, under the title of Making it New: Focus on Contemporary Australian Art. Of the works included in this survey, her bark painting titled Love me Safely had previously been part of a national exhibit in Canberra from 1994 to 1995, called Don’t Leave Me This Way: Art in the Age of AIDS. Since this 1994-1995 exhibit, Munungurr has remained a proponent of Aboriginal and Torres Strait Islanders battling disease and through her work has helped raise awareness regarding these issues.

One of the five artists from Arnhem Land chosen, Mununggurr, took part in the Djalkiri: We are Standing on their names: Blue Mud Bay project (2009-2010).  This project was designed to celebrate the Yolngu people of the Yilpara and Blue Mud Bay region, through the commemoration of ancestors by song, dance, paintings and other forms of artistic expression.  Here Marrnyula was particular in which artwork she presented, painting her mother’s design of the sailing cloth, a motif intrinsically connected to that of Yilpara and the sea rights ceremony of Blue Mud Bay.

Her exhibition of 252 small bark paintings, titled Ganybu in 2015 at the Gertrude Street Contemporary in Melbourne provided the artist with another opportunity to showcase her Djapu clan design. This work was subsequently acquired by the National Gallery of Victoria, and included in the exhibition Who's Afraid of Colour?. In 2019, Marrnyula completed another installation, made up of 297 small bark paintings, as a commission for the Kluge-Ruhe Aboriginal Art Collection. The work was exhibited at the 2019 Tarnanthi festival at the Art Gallery of South Australia.

She is also a firm advocate against climate change, helping promote awareness through her artwork like in her shared exhibition Zero Metres Above Sea Level, on display in Sydney since 2016. Through her work, environmentalists and botanists have studied the effects of modern day climate change and on the communities predicted to be most affected by it.

She remains a senior and well-respected printmaker at Yirrkala Printspace.

Style 

Her print works are often identified by her meticulous cross-hatching pattern design on bark mediums, which embody the freshwaters and estuaries of her native land. Such patterns embody the network of waterways, ridges and hills of the landscape. It is also of note that this design is representative of the fish traps typically woven by women used to scoop up fish. Since the Ganybu exhibition in 2015, Marrnyula has been associated with innovative installations made up of multiple small barks.

Maintaining a deep veneration of the spirits and lore, these themes have been incorporated into her artwork, helping reveal the importance of the landscape to these communities.

Awards 
 1994, Best Painting, Barunga Festival Art Awards. 
 2002, Honourable Mention, Michael Long Testimonial Art Award.
 2020, Telstra Bark Painting Prize, 2020 National Aboriginal and Torres Strait Islander Art Awards

Significant exhibitions 

1994: 11th National Aboriginal and Torres Strait Islander Art Awards, Museum and Art Gallery of the Northern Territory, Darwin
1996: 13th National Aboriginal and Torres Strait Islander Art Awards, Museum and Art Gallery of the Northern Territory, Darwin
1997: 14th National Aboriginal and Torres Strait Islander Art Awards, Museum and Art Gallery of the Northern Territory, Darwin
1999-2001: Saltwater: Yirrkala Bark Paintings of Sea Country. Drill Hall Gallery, Australian National University, Canberra; John Curtin Gallery, Curtin University, Perth; Australian National Maritime Museum, Sydney; Museum of Modern Art Heide; Melbourne; Araluen Art Centre, Alice Springs.
2008: 25th National Aboriginal and Torres Strait Islander Art Awards, Museum and Art Gallery of the Northern Territory, Darwin
2009: Making it New: Focus on Contemporary Australian Art. Museum of Contemporary Art, Sydney.
 2010: National Aboriginal and Torres Strait Islander Art Awards, Museum and Art Gallery of the Northern Territory, Darwin
2015: Ganybu. Gertrude Contemporary Art Spaces, Melbourne.
2016-17: Who's Afraid of Colour? National Gallery of Victoria, Melbourne
2019-2020: The Inside World: Contemporary Aboriginal Australian Memorial Poles. Nevada Museum of Art, Reno, NV; Charles H. Wright Museum of African American History, Detroit, MI; The Fralin Museum of Art, University of Virginia, Charlottesville, VA; Frost Art Museum, Florida International University, Miami, FL.
2019: Tarnanthi. Art Gallery of South Australia, Adelaide

Collections 
Art Gallery of New South Wales
Australian Museum
 Flinders University Art Museum
National Gallery of Australia
 Museum and Art Galleries of the Northern Territory
Kluge-Ruhe Aboriginal Art Collection of the University of Virginia
 National Maritime Museum
 Sydney Opera House
 National Museum of Australia
 University of Woolongong
 Singapore Art Gallery
 Toowoomba Regional Art Gallery

Further reading 

 Elina Spilia. "A World in a Turtle Egg." Meanjin, Vol. 65, No. 1, 2006: 154-163.
 Annie Studd, ed. Balnhdurr—a Lasting Impression. Yirrkala: Buku-Larrnggay Mulka Centre, 2015.

References

External links 

The artist's print studio can be found at Buku-Larrnggay Mulka, the Indigenous art centre located at Yirrkala.

Australian Aboriginal artists
Living people
1964 births
Australian contemporary artists
20th-century Australian artists
21st-century Australian artists
Artists from the Northern Territory
20th-century Australian women artists
21st-century Australian women artists